Psychroflexus salinarum  is a Gram-negative, rod-shaped and non-motile bacteria from the genus of Psychroflexus which has been isolated from the Yellow Sea in Korea.

References

Further reading

External links
Type strain of Psychroflexus salinarum at BacDive -  the Bacterial Diversity Metadatabase

Flavobacteria
Bacteria described in 2009